The following outline is provided as an overview of and topical guide to the U.S. state of Montana:

Montana – fourth most extensive of the 50 states of the United States of America. Montana is the northernmost of the western Mountain States. The Territory of Montana joined the Union as the 41st state on November 8, 1889.

General reference 

 Names
 Common name: Montana
 Pronunciation: 
 Official name: State of Montana
 Abbreviations and name codes
 Postal symbol:  MT
 ISO 3166-2 code:  US-MT
 Internet second-level domain:  .mt.us
 Nicknames
 Big Sky Country (currently used on license plates)
 The Last Best Place
 Treasure State (previously used on license plates)
 Adjectival: Montana
 Demonym: Montanan

Geography of Montana 

Geography of Montana
 Montana is: a U.S. state, a federal state of the United States of America
 Location:
 Northern hemisphere
 Western hemisphere
 Americas
 North America
 Anglo America
 Northern America
 United States of America
 Contiguous United States
 Canada–US border
 Western United States
 Mountain West United States
 Northwestern United States
 Population of Montana: 989,415  (2010 U.S. Census)
 Area of Montana:
 Atlas of Montana

Places in Montana 

Places in Montana

 Historic places in Montana
 Ghost towns in Montana
 National Historic Landmarks in Montana
 National Register of Historic Places listings in Montana
 Bridges on the National Register of Historic Places in Montana
 National Natural Landmarks in Montana
 National parks in Montana
 State parks in Montana
 Montana Dinosaur Trail
 List of trails of Montana
 List of oil fields of Montana

Environment of Montana 

 Climate of Montana
 Protected areas in Montana
 Forests in Montana
 Superfund sites in Montana
 Wildlife of Montana
 Flora of Montana
 Club-mosses and Mosses of Montana
 Coniferous plants of Montana
 Lichens of Montana
 Monocotyledons of Montana
 Dicotyledons of Montana
 Fauna of Montana
 Birds of Montana
 Clams and Mussels of Montana
 Crustaceans of Montana
 Mammals of Montana
 Amphibians and Reptiles of Montana
 Fish of Montana
 Snails and Slugs of Montana

Natural geographic features of Montana 

 Forests in Montana
 Islands of Montana
 Lakes of Montana
 Mountains of Montana
 Rapids in Montana
 Rivers of Montana
 Mountain passes in Montana (A-L)
 Mountain passes in Montana (M-Z)
 Waterfalls of Montana

Regions of Montana 

Regional designations of Montana
 Western Montana

Administrative divisions of Montana 
 The 56 counties of the state of Montana
 Municipalities in Montana
 Cities in Montana
 State capital of Montana: Helena
 Largest city in Montana: Billings
 City nicknames in Montana

Demography of Montana 

Demographics of Montana

Government and politics of Montana 

Politics of Montana
 Form of government: U.S. state government
 United States congressional delegations from Montana
 Montana State Capitol
 Political party strength in Montana

Branches of the government of Montana 

Government of Montana

Executive branch of the government of Montana 
Governor of Montana
Lieutenant Governor of Montana
 Secretary of State of Montana
 State departments
 Montana Department of Transportation
 Montana Department of Fish, Wildlife and Parks

Legislative branch of the government of Montana 

 Montana State Legislature (bicameral)
 Upper house: Montana Senate
 Lower house: Montana House of Representatives

Judicial branch of the government of Montana 

Courts of Montana
 Supreme Court of Montana

Law and order in Montana 
Law of Montana

 Cannabis in Montana
 Capital punishment in Montana
 Individuals executed in Montana
 Constitution of Montana
 Crime in Montana
 Gun laws in Montana
 Law enforcement in Montana
 Law enforcement agencies in Montana
 Baldwin v. Fish and Game Commission of Montana

Military in Montana 

 Montana Air National Guard
 Montana Army National Guard
 Military installations

History of Montana 
History of Montana
Timeline of Montana history
Timeline of pre-statehood Montana history
Timeline of Billings, Montana

History of Montana, by period 

Indigenous peoples
English territory of Rupert's Land, 1670–1707
French colony of Louisiane east of Continental Divide, 1699–1764
Treaty of Fontainebleau of 1762
British territory of Rupert's Land, (1707–1818)-1870
Spanish (though predominantly Francophone) district of Alta Luisiana east of Continental Divide, 1764–1803
Third Treaty of San Ildefonso of 1800
French district of Haute-Louisiane east of Continental Divide, 1803
Louisiana Purchase of 1803
Unorganized U.S. territory created by the Louisiana Purchase east of Continental Divide, 1803–1804
Lewis and Clark Expedition, 1804–1806
District of Louisiana east of Continental Divide, 1804–1805
Fur trade in Montana, 1806–1850s
Territory of Louisiana east of Continental Divide, 1805–1812
Territory of Missouri east of Continental Divide, 1812–1821
War of 1812, June 18, 1812 – March 23, 1815
Treaty of Ghent, December 24, 1814
Anglo-American Convention of 1818
Oregon Country west of Continental Divide, 1818–1846
Provisional Government of Oregon, 1843–1848
Oregon Treaty of 1846
Unorganized Territory east of Continental Divide, 1821–1854
Treaty of Fort Laramie of 1851
Mexican–American War, April 25, 1846 – February 2, 1848
Territory of Oregon west of Continental Divide, 1848–1859
Territory of Washington west of Continental Divide, (1853–1863)–1889
Territory of Nebraska east of Continental Divide, (1854–1861)–1867
Territory of Dakota east of Continental Divide, (1861–1863)–1889
Territory of Idaho, (1863–1864)–1890
Territory of Montana, 1864–1889
 Montana pioneers
American Civil War, April 12, 1861 – May 13, 1865
Montana in the American Civil War
Red Cloud's War, 1866–1868
Treaty of Fort Laramie of 1868
Yellowstone National Park designated first United States National Park on March 1, 1872
 Expeditions and the protection of Yellowstone (1869–1890)
Black Hills War, 1876–1877
Battle of the Rosebud, 1876
Battle of the Little Bighorn, 1876
Nez Perce War, 1877
State of Montana becomes 41st state admitted to the United States of America on November 8, 1889

History of Montana, by region 

 By city
 History of Anaconda

 History of Billings

 History of Butte

 History of Choteau
 History of Colstrip
 History of Columbia Falls
 History of Conrad
 History of Cut Bank
 History of Deer Lodge
 History of Dillon
 History of East Helena
 History of Forsyth
 History of Fort Benton
 History of Glasgow
 History of Glendive
 History of Great Falls
 History of Hamilton
 History of Hardin
 History of Harlem
 History of Harlowton
 History of Havre
 History of Helena
 History of Kalispell
 History of Laurel
 History of Lewistown
 History of Libby
 History of Livingston
 History of Malta
 History of Miles City
 History of Missoula
 History of Plentywood
 History of Polson
 History of Poplar
 History of Red Lodge
 History of Ronan
 History of Roundup
 History of Scobey
 History of Shelby
 History of Sidney
 History of Thompson Falls
 History of Three Forks
 History of Townsend
 History of Troy
 History of Whitefish
 History of White Sulphur Springs
 History of Wolf Point

History of Montana, by subject 

 Fur trade in Montana
 Notable figures in Montana history
 Territorial evolution of Montana

History publications about Montana 
 Bibliography of Montana history

Culture of Montana 

Culture of Montana
 Museums in Montana
 Religion in Montana
 Episcopal Diocese of Montana
 Scouting in Montana
 State symbols of Montana
 Flag of the state of Montana 
 Great Seal of the State of Montana

The Arts in Montana 
 Music of Montana

Sports in Montana 

Sports in Montana

Economy and infrastructure of Montana

Economy of Montana
 Communications in Montana
 Newspapers in Montana
 Radio stations in Montana
 Television stations in Montana
 Energy in Montana
 Oil fields in Montana
 Power stations in Montana
 Solar power in Montana
 Wind power in Montana
 Health care in Montana
 Hospitals in Montana
 Manufacturing in Montana
 Simms Fishing Products
 Transportation in Montana
 Airports in Montana
 Water in Montana
 List of dams and reservoirs in Montana
 List of lakes in Montana
 Tunnels in Montana

Education in Montana 

Education in Montana
 Schools in Montana
 School districts in Montana
 High schools in Montana
 Colleges and universities in Montana
 University of Montana
 Montana State University

See also

Topic overview:
Montana

Index of Montana-related articles

References

External links 

Montana
Montana